The Institute for Trade and Investment was the representative office of the Republic of Ireland to Taiwan.

History
The office was opened in 1989. In 2012, the office was closed due to austerity measures.

See also
 List of diplomatic missions of Ireland

References

1989 establishments in Taiwan
2012 disestablishments in Taiwan
Defunct organizations based in Taiwan
Diplomatic missions in Taiwan
Defunct diplomatic missions
Diplomatic missions of the Republic of Ireland
Government agencies established in 1989
Government agencies disestablished in 2012